Matěj Kvíčala (born 6 May 1989 in Jablonec nad Nisou) is a Czech luger who has competed since 1999. He finished 15th in the men's doubles event at the FIL European Luge Championships 2010 in Sigulda.

Kvíčala qualified for the 2010 Winter Olympics where he finished 18th.

References
 FIL-Luge profile

External links
 

1989 births
Living people
Czech male lugers
Olympic lugers of the Czech Republic
Lugers at the 2010 Winter Olympics
Lugers at the 2018 Winter Olympics
Sportspeople from Jablonec nad Nisou